Hunted (U.S. The Stranger In Between) is a British Noir crime film directed by Charles Crichton and released in 1952.  Hunted is a crime drama in the form of a chase film, starring Dirk Bogarde, and written by Jack Whittingham and Michael McCarthy. It was produced by Julian Wintle and edited by Gordon Hales and Geoffrey Muller, with cinematography by Eric Cross and music by Hubert Clifford.

The film won the Golden Leopard award at the 1952 Locarno International Film Festival.

Crichton regarded the film as a breakthrough movie for him. "That's when I got more sure of myself," he said.

Plot
Robbie (Jon Whiteley), an orphaned 6-year-old boy, has been placed with uncaring and harsh adoptive parents in London.  Having accidentally set a small fire in the house, he fears he will receive severe punishment as he has in the past for misdemeanours, so flees into the London streets. Here, he literally runs into Chris Lloyd (Dirk Bogarde) who is himself on the run as he has, in the heat of passion, just killed  his wife's employer, whom Lloyd had discovered, was having an affair with his wife. 
Robbie attaches himself to Lloyd, who repeatedly tries to rid himself of the boy, albeit as caringly as possible. Lloyd decides, hesitantly, to use the boy to retrieve some much needed cash from his apartment. Thereafter, Lloyd feels compelled to bring Robbie along with him. The film follows the pair as they travel northwards towards Scotland, with the police in somewhat baffled pursuit, and charts the developing relationship between the two. Initially Lloyd regards Robbie dismissively, as an unwanted inconvenience, while Robbie is wary and suspicious of Lloyd.  As their journey progresses, however, the pair gradually develop a strong bond of friendship, trust and common cause. Both feel they have 'burned their bridges' and now have nothing to lose.  They finally reach a small Scottish fishing port, where Lloyd steals a boat and sets sail for Ireland. During the voyage Robbie falls seriously ill, and Lloyd turns the boat back towards Scotland, where he knows the police are waiting for him.

Cast
 Dirk Bogarde as Chris Lloyd
 Jon Whiteley as Robbie
 Elizabeth Sellars as Magda Lloyd
 Kay Walsh as Mrs. Sykes
 Frederick Piper as Mr. Sykes
 Julian Somers as Jack Lloyd
 Jane Aird as Mrs. Campbell
 Jack Stewart as Mr. Campbell
 Geoffrey Keen as Detective Inspector Drakin
 Douglas Blackwell as Detective Sergeant Grayson  
 Leonard White as Police Station Sergeant  
 Gerald Anderson as Assistant Commissioner  
 Denis Webb as Chief Superintendent  
 Gerald Case as Deputy Assistant Commissioner  
 John Bushelle as Chief Inspector

Production
Jon Whiteley was cast after a friend of Charles Crichton heard him reciting "The Owl and the Pussycat" on radio on The Children's Hour. He was called in for a screen test and was cast.

Much of the film was shot on location, with three main areas being used.  
The early London exterior scenes were shot in the Pimlico/Victoria area, which at the time still had derelict corners showing evidence of wartime damage.
The location chosen for the scenes set in the English Midlands was the area in and around Stoke-on-Trent, with its distinctive industrial skyline of factory chimneys and giant pottery kilns.  The railway sequence in this section was shot on the now-defunct Potteries Loop Line, and this scene has come to be regarded as historically significant by British railway enthusiasts as it provides a very rare filmic depiction of the long-gone line in operation. 
Scottish filming took place in the vicinity of Portpatrick in Wigtownshire and featured the fishing boat 'Mizpah' BA-11 built by Noble of Girvan (1949).

References

External links
 
 
 Discussion of filming locations of Hunted @ britmovie.net

1952 films
1952 crime drama films
British black-and-white films
British buddy films
British crime drama films
British chase films
Films directed by Charles Crichton
Films set in England
Films set in Scotland
Films shot at Pinewood Studios
Golden Leopard winners
Films set in London
Films with screenplays by Jack Whittingham
1950s English-language films
1950s British films